Nukie is a 1987 South African science-fiction film directed by Sias Odendaal and Michael Pakleppa, and based on an original story by Odendaal. The film stars Anthony Morrison, Steve Railsback, Ronald France, and Glynis Johns. The plot concerns an alien, Nukie, who crash lands on Earth and seeks help from two children to reunite with his brother, Miko, who has been captured by the US government.  The film was considered a knock-off of Steven Spielberg's 1982 film E.T. the Extra-Terrestrial and is also considered one of the worst movies ever made.

Plot 

Two aliens, Nukie and Miko, crash on Earth and are separated. Nukie ends up in the African savanna while Miko falls into the hands of the Space Foundation in America. Miko reaches out to Nukie telepathically and informs him that he is being held captive. The head of the Space Foundation operation Dr. Glynn sends Dr. Eric Harvey to Nairobi to investigate the other crash site. During their experiments, the scientists discover that Miko is a being made of pure energy.

Nukie begins to explore his surroundings, coming across two children, Tiko and Toki, who can understand Nukie. He asks them for their help with finding America, but they run off vowing not to tell anybody about what has happened.

Sister Anne, the head of a Catholic mission, is contacted via radio to inform her that Dr. Harvey is on his way. Nukie comes across Charlie, a talking Chimpanzee, who speaks to Nukie but he claims he does not know about America. The Corporal attempts to shoot Nukie, but he teleports out of harm's way and saves Tiko and Toki from a mountain lion. The boys then agree to help Nukie find America. Nukie attempts to commandeer Dr. Harvey's helicopter but crashes it.

At the Space Foundation, Miko has started to befriend the supercomputer, the Electronic Digital Data Intelligence computer (nicknamed E.D.D.I), and convinces him to scan for Nukie. Dr. Harvey repairs the helicopter and takes off, tracking Nukie. Tiko and Toki are brought before the tribal chief Sangoma and are banished for bringing Nukie into their midst. The two later reunite with Nukie, who expresses disappointment over their banishment.

Tiko is bitten by a cobra and is taken back to the camp by Dr. Harvey while the Corporal arrives and shoots Nukie with tranquilizers. The tribe carries Nukie's unconscious body back to the village. Tiko tells Dr. Harvey and Sister Anne about Nukie's capture. E.D.D.I attempts once more to scan for Nukie, and manages to lock in on Toki.

Toki discovers the tribe has Nukie imprisoned in a cage and sneaks into the Corporal's truck as he transports Nukie, later freeing him at a trading post with Charlie. The Corporal finds Toki and holds him at gunpoint as Nukie and Charlie escape. Sister Anne is alerted to the Corporal's presence and distracts him long enough to allow the pair to escape. Nukie finds Tiko at the infirmary and heals him as Toki and Charlie arrive. Toki and Nukie decide to leave Tiko to recover and set off to find America. 

Sister Anne attempts to contact Dr. Harvey but finds out that he has left for America and that the Corporal has been trying to sell Nukie. E.D.D.I attempts to free Miko, but cannot bypass the security system. Miko manages to escape with the help of Pamela Carter.

Nukie and Toki manage to evade the Corporal, who drives off the edge of a cliff into a river while attempting to run them down. Nukie ends up in the river too and goes over a waterfall, severely injuring him. Unable to contact Miko, Nukie suggests that the two of them try flying away. They manage to fly some of the way, but Nukie collapses from exhaustion and crashes.

Toki wishes for his family as well as Miko and Nukie to be with him. Following his wish, Tiko, their mother, and Sister Anne arrive. Tiko explains that Nukie is not a bad omen as the tribe claim, but a friend who is in need. Nukie then appears in his light form, and Dr. Harvey lands in his helicopter bringing Miko with him. Miko and Nukie greet each other and inform the humans that they have to leave. Charlie asks to join them, and the three turn into balls of light before flying away.

Cast 
 Anthony Morrison – Nukie & Miko
 Siphiwe Mlangeni – Tiko
 Sipho Mlangeni – Toki
 Glynis Johns – Sister Anne
 Steve Railsback – Dr. Eric Harvey
 Ronald France – The Corporal
 David Fox – Nukie
 Sam Ntsinyi – Sangoma
 Jabulile Phakane – Dube
 Fats Dibeco (as Fats Dibeko) – Mpefu
 Reed Evans – Dr. Barbara Rhinestone
 Carin C. Tietze – Pamela Carter
 Lester C. Muller – Dr. Norman Glynn
 Marcel Schneider – Officer Connally
 Calvin Burke (as Calvin E. Burke) – Dr. Bradley
 Nghaupe Pheto – Hunter
 Meshak Dlamini – Hunter
 Siphiwe Nyaosi – Mpadi
 Charlie the Chimpanzee (uncredited) – Charlie the Chimpanzee

Reception 

Witney Seibold of /Film writes that "Nukie is only remarkable for how undeniably terrible it is", noting that it appears on lists of the worst films ever made. Critic Brad Jones, the creator and star of the web series The Cinema Snob, selected Nukie as the worst film he has ever seen.  British film magazine Total Film described Nukie as an "atrocity heralded by some as the 'most painful movie ever made'". Total Film listed it in separate articles as the worst kids movie ever made and one of the worst science-fiction films ever made.  HUMO also included it on a list of the worst science-fiction movies ever made, while AlloCiné listed it as one of the worst films of the 1980s.

Simon Abrams of Politico compared Nukie to another E.T. the Extra-Terrestrial knock-off, Mac and Me. Abrams wrote that Nukie was worse than Mac and Me, adding that it was "probably the most incompetent E.T. ripoff of any time period ... While Mac and Me was just rotten and ill-conceived, Nukie is uniquely perplexing."  Comic Book Resources described it as E.T.s "most infamous imitator" and reported that it is "regarded as one of the worst movies ever made".

VHS auction 
The Milwaukee-based production company Red Letter Media spent nearly a decade collecting Nukie VHS tapes after fans began mailing them copies of the film. Despite this, they never watched the film until December 2022, when they released a special episode about the practice of grading VHS tapes following a VHS copy of Back to the Future auctioning for $75,000. The group had one copy of the movie professionally graded, while the others were destroyed using a woodchipper to inflate the graded tape's value. The graded tape was then auctioned off on eBay with proceeds going to charity, selling for $80,600. The results of the auction made Nukie the most expensive VHS tape in history.

References

External links 
 
 Nukie at AllMovie
 Trailer

1987 films
1987 independent films
1980s adventure comedy films
1980s science fiction comedy films
Alien visitations in films
E.T. the Extra-Terrestrial
1980s English-language films
Films about NASA
Films set in Nairobi
Films set in the United States
Films shot in Germany
Mockbuster films
Trimark Pictures films
South African adventure comedy films
South African science fiction comedy films
English-language South African films